Picturesque Matchstickable Messages from the Status Quo is the debut studio album by the English rock band Status Quo, released in September 1968. It features several covers, including "Green Tambourine" by The Lemon Pipers.

Background
The album's lead single was originally intended to be "Gentleman Joe's Sidewalk Café", with the original Francis Rossi composition "Pictures of Matchstick Men" as the b-side, but these songs were eventually swapped round. It reached #7 in the UK, and remains the band's only major hit single in the US, where it reached #12. It also reached #8 in Canada. A second single, Rossi's "Black Veils of Melancholy" (with organist Roy Lynes' non-album track "To Be Free" as the b-side), flopped and has even been called "a carbon copy of "Pictures of Matchstick Men"". The third single, "Ice in the Sun", was written for the band by Marty Wilde and Ronnie Scott (not the jazz musician), with the Rossi/Parfitt composition "When My Mind Is Not Live" as the b-side. It reached #8 in the UK, and #29 in Canada.

The album itself was released on 27 September 1968, and failed to make the UK album charts. The band planned to release a fourth single from the album - "Technicolour Dreams" backed with the Wilde/Scott composition "Paradise Flat" - but this was withdrawn after a few days in favour of a non-album single release early the following year. The new single, Rossi and Parfitt's "Make Me Stay a Bit Longer", with bassist Alan Lancaster's "Auntie Nellie" as the b-side, was released on 31 January 1969. As well as getting the "thumbs up" from a majority of the record reviewers, this single was also something of a landmark for the group, as it would be their final release to credit them as "the" Status Quo.

Track listing
Side one
"Black Veils of Melancholy" (Francis Rossi) – 3:17
"When My Mind Is Not Live" (Rossi, Rick Parfitt) – 2:50
"Ice in the Sun" (Marty Wilde, Ronnie Scott) – 2:13
"Elizabeth Dreams" (Wilde, Scott) – 3:29
"Gentleman Joe's Sidewalk Café" (Kenny Young) – 3:01
"Paradise Flat" (Wilde, Scott) – 3:13
Side two
"Technicolor Dreams" (Anthony King) – 2:54
"Spicks and Specks" (Barry Gibb) – 2:46
"Sheila" (Tommy Roe) – 1:56 (not on US version)
"Sunny Cellophane Skies" (Alan Lancaster) – 2:47
"Green Tambourine" (Paul Leka, Shelley Pinz) – 2:19 (not on US version)
"Pictures of Matchstick Men" (Rossi) – 3:13

1994 Japan Bonus Tracks
"To Be Free" (Roy Lynes) – 2:36 B-side
"Make Me Stay A Little Bit Longer" (Rossi, Parfitt) – 2:54 A-side
"Auntie Nellie" (Lancaster) – 3:20 B-Side
"Face Without Soul"  (Rossi, Parfitt) – 3:08  
"Mr. Mind Detector" (King) – 4:01
"Antique Angelique"  (Lancaster, K. Young) – 3:23
"Little Miss Nothing"  (Rossi, Parfitt) – 3:01 
"Are You Growing Tired Of My Love" (King) – 3:37
"I (Who Have Nothing)"  (Carlo Donida, Jerry Leiber, Mike Stoller) – 3:01 
"Hurdy Gurdy Man" (Lancaster, Pat Barlow) – 3:16
"(We Ain't Got) Nothin' Yet" (Mike Esposito, Ron Gilbert, Ralph Scala) – 2:18
"I Want It" (Lynes, John Coghlan, Rossi, Lancaster) – 3:02   
"Almost But Not Quite There"  (Rossi, Barlow) – 2:46
"Wait Just A Minute" (Lynes) – 2:14
"Tune To The Music" (Bob Young, Rossi) 3:10

"2009 Deluxe edition"

Personnel
Status Quo
Francis Rossi - lead guitar, vocals
Rick Parfitt - rhythm guitar, vocals
Alan Lancaster - bass guitar
John Coghlan - drums
Roy Lynes - organ, vocals

References

Status Quo (band) albums
1968 debut albums
Pye Records albums
Psychedelic rock albums by English artists